Sheikh Zayed refers to Zayed bin Sultan Al Nahyan (1918–2004), the Emir and ruler of UAE

Sheikh Zayed may also refer to:

People 

 Sheikh Zayed bin Khalifa Al Nahyan (1835 or 1840–1909), ruler of Abu Dhabi, grandfather of Sheikh Zayed bin Sultan, founder of the United Arab Emirates
 Sheikh Zayed bin Sultan Al Nahyan (1918–2004), ruler of Abu Dhabi, grandson of Zayed bin Khalifa founder and first president of United Arab Emirates

Places

In the UAE 

 Sheikh Zayed Bridge, an arch bridge in Abu Dhabi
 Sheikh Zayed Cricket Stadium, a stadium in UAE
 Shaikh Zayed International Airport
 Sheikh Zayed Mosque, mosque in Abu Dhabi
 Sheikh Zayed Palace Museum, also known as the Al Ain Palace Museum, a museum in the city of Al Ain, UAE

In other countries 

 Sheikh Zayed City, city in the Giza Governorate in Egypt and part of Greater Cairo urban area
 Shaikh Zayed Medical Complex Lahore, Pakistan
 Shaikh Zayed Hospital, a tertiary care hospital, Lahore, Pakistan
 Shaikh Zayed Medical College and Hospital, Rahim Yar Khan, Punjab, Pakistan

Other uses 

 Sheikh Zayed Book Award

See also